Jonathan Greenblatt (born November 21, 1970) is an American entrepreneur, corporate executive, and the sixth National Director and CEO of the Anti-Defamation League (ADL). Prior to heading the ADL, Greenblatt served in the White House as Special Assistant to Barack Obama and Director of the Office of Social Innovation and Civic Participation.

Early life and education
Greenblatt was born on November 21, 1970, in Trumbull, Connecticut, to a Conservative Jewish family. He graduated from Tufts University in 1992, earning a Bachelor of Arts. After college, Greenblatt worked on Bill Clinton's successful presidential campaign in 1992 in Little Rock, Arkansas. He went on to join the administration as an aide in the Clinton White House and later the United States Department of Commerce, where he developed international economic policy with a focus on emerging markets and post-conflict economies. Greenblatt also holds a Masters in Business Administration from the Kellogg School of Management at Northwestern University.

Career

Ethos Water
In 2002, Greenblatt and his business school roommate, Peter Thum, founded Ethos Water, a premium bottled water social enterprise. The company sought to help children around the world get access to free water by donating a portion of their profits to finance water programs in developing countries. In 2005, Starbucks acquired the company for $8 million. Following the acquisition, Greenblatt served as Starbucks Vice President of Global Consumer Products, scaling Ethos across the United States. Greenblatt also co-founded Ethos International, and served on the board of directors of the Starbucks Foundation, where he developed Ethos' global investment strategy that has invested millions of dollars to bring clean water to communities in need around the world, including Bangladesh, the Democratic Republic of Congo, Ethiopia, Honduras, India, and Kenya.

All for Good
Greenblatt also founded All for Good (AFG), the open source platform developed to enable more Americans to serve. AFG is the largest aggregation of volunteer opportunities on the Web, and is supported by a coalition of leading companies, non-profits, and government agencies, all of whom shared a vision of using open data to increase the number of Americans that participate in service and volunteerism. Craig Newmark, the founder of Craigslist, helped to sponsor the organization, and the open-source code was utilized by [serve.gov]. In 2011, AFG was acquired by the Points of Light Institute in a strategic partnership designed to help the organization scale.

Good Worldwide
Greenblatt was formerly the CEO of GOOD Worldwide, LLC. He led GOOD's transition from a publishing company to a diversified media company. Its products include the website GOOD.is and GOOD Magazine. As CEO, Greenblatt pushed a number of innovations at the company, including the launch of the GOOD Sheet, a broadsheet product distributed exclusively at Starbucks, and a name-your-own-pricing scheme that the company ran as an experiment. It is not clear whether this strategy was successful. Greenblatt said in 2008 that the broadsheets were intended to be ideologically neutral.

Impact Economy Initiative

Greenblatt founded the Impact Economy Initiative at the Aspen Institute to help policy makers create an enabling environment for the emerging market of social enterprise and impact investing. The Initiative worked with thought leaders across impact sectors, including co-convening the Impact Economy Summit at the White House in October 2011.

Other ventures
Greenblatt served as an operating partner at Satori Capital, a private equity firm focused on conscious capitalism, and was an active angel investor. He also served as a member of the faculty at the UCLA Anderson School of Management, where he developed and taught its coursework on social entrepreneurship.

Greenblatt was named CEO of the Anti-Defamation League in 2014.

Obama administration
In the fall of 2011, Greenblatt was appointed to serve as Special Assistant to the President for President Obama and Director of the Office of Social Innovation and Civic Participation (SICP) in the United States Domestic Policy Council. As Director, he led the Office's efforts to utilize human capital and financial capital to bring attention to community solutions. The Office focused on issues such as national service, civic engagement, impact investing, and social enterprise.

In his role as Director of SICP, Greenblatt took an active role in supporting AmeriCorps, supporting social entrepreneurs, and working with the G8 taskforce to support social impact investment. Greenblatt was involved in a number of administration priorities, including preventing gun violence and #GivingTuesday. Greenblatt left the administration in 2014 and was succeeded by David Wilkinson.

"Real Facebook Oversight Board"
On 30 September 2020, Greenblatt was named as one of the 25 members of the "Real Facebook Oversight Board", a group of academics, researchers and civil rights leaders created to counter the existing Facebook Oversight Board, an independent monitoring group over Facebook which they view as insufficient.

Personal life
Greenblatt is the grandson of a Holocaust survivor. He is married to Marjan Keypour Greenblatt, an Iranian Jewish political refugee to the United States who is the founder and director of The Alliance for Rights of All Minorities (ARAM), a non-profit. They have three children.

References

External links 

 

1970 births
Living people
21st-century American businesspeople
American political consultants
American Zionists
Anti-Defamation League members
Jewish American philanthropists
Jewish American writers
Kellogg School of Management alumni
Tufts University alumni
Henry Crown Fellows
21st-century American Jews